Down For The Count is Kingston, Pennsylvania punk rock band Title Fight's first recording. It is a five-song EP.

Track listing

References

Title Fight albums
2003 EPs